Ayça Naz İhtiyaroğlu (born August 13, 1984 in İstanbul) is a Turkish volleyball player. She is 169 cm tall and plays as libero. She has been playing for Galatasaray Women's Volleyball Team since 2009 season start and wears number 8. She played 53 times for national team. She also played for Yeşilyurt and Fenerbahçe Acıbadem.

Ayça is engaged with Fenerbahçe SK captain Arslan Ekşi.

See also
 Turkish women in sports

References

External links
 

1984 births
Living people
Volleyball players from Istanbul
Turkish women's volleyball players
Fenerbahçe volleyballers
Galatasaray S.K. (women's volleyball) players
21st-century Turkish women